Richard Wayne Bandler (born 1950) is an American consultant in the field of self-help. With John Grinder, he founded the neuro-linguistic programming (NLP) approach to psychotherapy in the 1970s.

Education and background
Bandler was born in Teaneck, New Jersey and attended high school in Sunnyvale, California. He has stated that he was beaten as a child so badly that every bone in his body was broken. After his parents separated, he moved with his mother and stayed mostly in and around San Francisco. Bandler obtained a BA degree in philosophy and psychology from the University of California, Santa Cruz (UCSC) in 1973, and an MA degree in psychology from Lone Mountain College in San Francisco in 1975.

Neuro-linguistic programming

Bandler helped publisher Robert S. Spitzer (of Science and Behavior Books, Inc.) edit The Gestalt Approach (1973) based on a manuscript by gestalt therapist Fritz Perls (who had died in 1970). He also assisted with checking transcripts for Eye Witness to Therapy (1973). According to Spitzer, "[Bandler] came out of it talking and acting like Fritz Perls."

While a student at UCSC, Bandler also led a Gestalt therapy group. John Grinder, a professor at the University, said to Bandler that he could explain almost all the questions and comments Bandler made using transformational grammar. Grinder's specialty was in linguistics. Together, they created what they called a therapist training group. This was the basis for their first book, The Structure of Magic (1975).  Bandler and Grinder claim to have later codified some of the foundational models for Neuro-linguistic programming in part by studying and methods of Milton Erickson and Virginia Satir.

Murder trial and acquittal
In 1986, Corine Ann Christensen (December 8, 1954 – November 3, 1986), a former girlfriend of Bandler's friend and cocaine dealer, James Marino, was shot dead in her Santa Cruz townhouse with a .357 magnum owned by Bandler. Authorities charged Bandler with her murder. Bandler testified that he had been at Christensen's house, but that Marino had shot Christensen. After a short deliberation, a jury found Bandler not guilty.

Publications
 
 
 
 
 
 
 
 
Using Your Brain for a Change, 1985
An Insider's Guide To Sub-Modalities, 1988 Richard Bandler, Will MacDonald
Magic in Action, 1992
Time for a Change, 1993
 
 
 
 
 
 
 
 
 Richard Bandler and Kate Benson (2016) Teaching Excellence. Bandler Benson publications. 391pp. .
 Richard Bandler, Dr. Glenda Bradstock and Owen Fitzpatrick (2019) Thinking on Purpose, a 15 Day Plan to a Smarter Life. New Thinking Publications.  272pp.  .

References

External links
Guardian feature by Jon Ronson
Richard Bandler NLP
German Discussion-Board about Richard Bandler
NLP Events London 
NHR Events 
 NLPLife Youtube channel

1950 births
Jewish American writers
American hypnotists
Living people
Neuro-linguistic programming writers
People acquitted of murder
University of California, Santa Cruz alumni
People from Teaneck, New Jersey
American self-help writers
21st-century American Jews